is a Japanese racing driver. He currently drives in the Formula Nippon, and the Super GT series in the GT500 category. He is not related to fellow Japanese driver Kamui Kobayashi.

In 2010 he won the All-Japan Formula Three championship, National Class.

In 2010 he made his debut in the Super GT series (GT500) at the Pokka GT Summer Special (Suzuka Circuit) as the 3rd driver of the ARTA. Despite the team mistakenly declaring him to qualify instead of Ralph Firman in the final session, he claimed the pole position, being the first to do so on a debut. the ARTA team won the race the following day.

His performance led to him becoming part of the new lineup of ARTA in the 2011 Super GT season, partnered with former IndyCar Series driver Hideki Mutoh.

Racing record

Complete Super GT results

* Season still in progress.

External links
REAL RACING F3 website
driverdb
SUPERGT Official website

1987 births
Living people
Japanese racing drivers
Japanese Formula 3 Championship drivers
Formula Nippon drivers
Super GT drivers
Super Formula drivers
Formula Challenge Japan drivers
Asian Le Mans Series drivers
Mugen Motorsports drivers
Team Aguri drivers